Keijiro Kaitoku (7 December 1929 – 1997) was a Japanese sailor. He competed in the Finn event at the 1952 Summer Olympics.

References

External links
 

1929 births
1997 deaths
Japanese male sailors (sport)
Olympic sailors of Japan
Sailors at the 1952 Summer Olympics – Finn
People from Nishinomiya